"Like a Man" is a song recorded by Canadian country music singer Dallas Smith and released as the fifth single from his 2020 album Timeless. The song was written by David Garcia, Jessi Alexander, and Josh Miller, while Garcia produced the track with Joey Moi. It was named "Single of the Year" at the 2021 Canadian Country Music Awards.

Background
Like a Man was released amidst the coronavirus pandemic and Smith remarked that he hoped the track would give listeners "a 3 minute escape from the craziness we’re living in".

Accolades

Commercial performance
"Like a Man" reached a peak of Number One on the Billboard Canada Country chart dated August 22, 2020. It became Smith's ninth-consecutive Number One hit on the chart, and tenth overall, extending both records Smith holds for a Canadian country artist. It also peaked at number 60 on the Billboard Canadian Hot 100, marking Smith's highest charting entry there since "Wastin' Gas" in 2014. It has been certified Platinum by Music Canada.

Charts

Certifications

References

2020 songs
2020 singles
Dallas Smith songs
604 Records singles
Songs written by David Garcia (musician)
Songs written by Jessi Alexander
Song recordings produced by Joey Moi
Canadian Country Music Association Single of the Year singles